"Sugar" is a song by the alternative rock band My Bloody Valentine. It was released as a non-album split single with Pacific, whose song "December, with the Day" is featured as the single's b-side. "Sugar"/"December, with the Day" was released in February 1989 on Creation Records and issued free with issue 67 of the British music magazine The Catalogue.

Written by vocalist and guitarist Kevin Shields, "Sugar" was recorded prior to the initial recording sessions for the band's second studio album Loveless (1991). Creation Records had requested My Bloody Valentine to record a track for The Catalogue and coincidentally "right at the same time, Bill Carey, a friend [of the band] who worked in a studio said that anytime [they] wanted to mess around in a studio, [they] could, so [they] went in and made ["Sugar"] up."

Originally released as a square 7-inch flexi disc, "Sugar" was later featured as the b-side on the 1992 French pressing of "Only Shallow". A remastered version was released on the compilation album EP's 1988–1991 (2012). Critics have described the song as "a drowsily sweet, raggedly swaying number" and "structurally pitched somewhere in between the sonic excesses of Isn't Anything and experimental passages on Loveless".

Track listing

Personnel
My Bloody Valentine
Kevin Shields – vocals, guitar
Bilinda Butcher – guitar
Debbie Googe – bass
Colm Ó Cíosóig – drums

Technical personnel
My Bloody Valentine – production

References

1989 songs
1989 singles
My Bloody Valentine (band) songs
Creation Records singles
Split singles
Songs written by Kevin Shields